A comedy troupe  is a group of comedians and associated personnel who work together to perform comedy as entertainment. The term is often used interchangeably with comedy group, and the troupe may specialize in a specific genre or style of comedy.

Some examples of comedy troupes include: the Marx Brothers, the Three Stooges, the Second City, Kalabhavan, the Firesign Theatre, Monty Python, the Kids in the Hall, the Mighty Boosh, the Tenderloins, the Hollow Men, Asperger's Are Us, Kummeli, Senario and Horrible Histories troupe (known as The Six Idiots).

See also
Improvisational theatre
Sketch comedy

References